The Tropidophiidae, common name dwarf boas or thunder snakes, are a family of nonvenomous snakes found from Mexico and the West Indies south to southeastern Brazil. These are small to medium-sized fossorial snakes, some with beautiful and striking color patterns. Currently, two living genera, containing 34 species, are recognized. Two other genera (Ungaliophis and Exiliboa) were once considered to be tropidophiids but are now known to be more closely related to the boids, and are classified in the subfamily Ungaliophiinae. There are a relatively large number of fossil snakes that have been described as tropidophiids (because their vertebrae are easy to identify), but which of these are more closely related to Tropidophis and Trachyboa and which are more closely related to Ungaliophis and Exiliboa is unknown.

Description
This family is confined to the neotropics, mainly in Hispaniola, Jamaica, and the Cayman Islands, with the greatest diversity being in Cuba, where new species are still being discovered.

Behavior
Most species spend their day burrowed underground or under vegetation, surfacing only at night or when it rains. Some species are arboreal and are often seen hiding in bromeliads in trees.

Color change
The dwarf boas can change color from light (when they are active at night) to dark (inactive in the day). 
This color change is brought about by the movement of dark pigment granules.

Defensive behavior
When threatened, tropidophiids coil up into a tight ball. A more peculiar defensive behavior is their ability to bleed voluntarily from the eyes, mouth, and nostrils.

Distribution and habitat
They are found from southern Mexico and Central America, south to northwestern South America in Colombia, (Amazonian) Ecuador, and Peru, as well as in northwestern and southeastern Brazil, and also in the West Indies.

Fossils
Fossils of 10 extinct species in five genera from the Paleocene, Eocene, and Oligocene of Europe, Africa, and North and South America have been assigned to the Tropidophiidae, although all of them are probably actually either ungaliophiines or stem afrophidians. Two genera, Falseryx and Rottophis, both from the Oligocene of western Europe, have some similarities with living tropidophiids as well as with ungaliophiines, but for the most part their skulls are poorly preserved, leaving paleontologists to work on just their vertebrae. Paleogene erycines dominated the snake fauna of North America prior to the Miocene explosion of colubroids, but as far as we know all of these species were much more closely related to modern rosy and rubber boas than they were to tropidophiids. The only unequivocal tropidophiid fossils are from the Pleistocene of Florida and the Bahamas.

Genera

T Type genus.

Cited references

External links
Tropidophiidae at Life is Short but Snakes are Long

 
Taxa named by Leo Brongersma
Snake families